"Remember When the Music" is a song written and performed by Harry Chapin, from the album Sequel. The song is the next chronological single from his hit single, "Sequel" from the same album. It reached the top 50 on the Billboard Adult Contemporary chart and spent five weeks on the chart.

Background
The song was written as a tribute to Allard K. Lowenstein, a former New York congressman who was shot and killed in 1980. Chapin stated that the song became more apparent when John Lennon was killed the same year.

Chart performance

Different versions
The song has three different versions. It consists of a reprise, which is an acoustic take on the song. The second version is the regular song, that was released as a single. The third version is very similar to the second version, with only minor differences.

Other uses
Bruce Springsteen sang the song at the Harry Chapin Tribute concert.

References

1980 songs
Harry Chapin songs
Songs written by Harry Chapin
Commemoration songs